Ljutovid was an independent Serbian ruler of Zahumlje, in present-day western Herzegovina and southern Croatia, who flourished in the middle of the 11th century in alliance with the Byzantine Empire. He held the supreme authority of Serbs at that time.

In a charter dated July 1039, Ljutovid is styled "protospatharios epi tou Chrysotriklinou, hypatos, strategos" of "Serbia and Zahumlje", which suggests Emperor Michael IV granted him nominal right over neighbouring lands, including Duklja. 

In 1042, the Župan of Rascia, Ban of Bosnia and Ljutovid, receives piles of imperial gold and silver from the Byzantines for the support to overthrowing Stefan Vojislav of Duklja. He led the army of the allied force against Duklja in 1043 but was ambushed at the Klobuk hill of Konavli (then part of Travunia) by Vojislav, who defeated the army. Vojislav went on to pursue and annex most of Zahumlje and Travunia.

In a possibly forged document, with two variants dated 1039 and 1151, Ljutovid awarded the monastery on Lokrum with Babino Polje on the island of Mljet (modern Croatia). According to it, Protospatar Ljutovit declared that no one, neither Ragusan, nor citizen of Ston, neither Latin, nor Slav, could impede the donation.

References

Sources

11th-century rulers in Europe
11th-century Serbian nobility
11th-century Byzantine people
Medieval Bosnian nobility
11th century in Croatia
Medieval Herzegovina
History of the Serbs
History of Dalmatia
Byzantine Serbia